The Seiyū Club ("Constitutional Friends Club") was a short-lived political party in Japan.

History
The party was established in February 1913 as a 26 MP breakaway from Rikken Seiyūkai led Yukio Ozaki over objections to Yamamoto Gonnohyōe being appointed Prime Minister.

The party was a strident critic of Gonnohyōe and one of the strongest supporters of party government of its time. However, some members soon defected back to Rikken Seiyūkai, and in December 1913 the remaining MPs merged with Ekirakukai to form the Chūseikai.

References

Defunct political parties in Japan
Political parties established in 1913
1913 establishments in Japan
Political parties disestablished in 1913
1913 disestablishments in Japan